The Solano County Green Valley AVA is an American Viticultural Area located in Solano County, California. The valley is close to San Pablo Bay and thus has a maritime climate.  
Most of the vineyards are planted on the valley floor and benefit from moist, cooling winds in the summer afternoons.

References

American Viticultural Areas of the San Francisco Bay Area
Geography of Solano County, California
American Viticultural Areas
1982 establishments in California